Conrad Thomas Lant (born 15 January 1963), also known by his stage name Cronos, is an English musician. He is the founder, vocalist, bassist, and occasional guitarist of heavy metal band Venom.

Biography

Early life
After playing in a couple of high school bands; Dwarfstar and Album Graecum, Conrad Lant took the stage name Cronos and joined a band called Guillotine as a guitarist in 1979, where he met Jeffrey Dunn, who later became Mantas. In 1979, the original bassist left one week before a church hall gig. Instead of not playing the venue, Cronos took up the bass and they changed the band name to 'Venom'. He continued to play the bass throughout his career in Venom. In 1980, the band's vocalist, Clive Archer (with stage name Jesus Christ), left the band, leaving Cronos to take over this role too and finalising the band into a three-piece group.

Cronos was working in a recording studio after he left school called Impulse Studios, the studio had a number of labels releasing albums by folk musicians and local TV comedians, although he eventually convinced the studio to start a label for rock bands, the label was called 'Neat Records' and began signing bands from up and down the UK, releasing singles and albums from 1980 onwards. As the members of Venom could not afford the studio time fees, Cronos was able to talk the studio engineer into letting him have some free time in exchange for staying back late after work and carrying out other unpaid work. Cronos sent many copies of the Venom demos to various record labels and also the rock press, where a journalist for the 'Sounds' magazine [Geoff Barton] featured three Venom songs in his playlist, which got the attention of the label 'Neat Records', who then agreed to release the first Venom single.

Cronos was also responsible for designing and creating all of the Venom logo and the sleeves artwork for their many single and album releases. He wanted to use the Sigil of Baphomet as the band's main emblem, although he wanted to recreate a new version of the sigil to be new and original concept, so he set out to redesigning it. The Venom logo was drawn and redrawn many times before he was happy, and the development of the logo can be seen from the band's many singles and albums releases, as the logo become more and more fine tuned as the years go on. The logo continues to evolve as Cronos still designs new versions for merchandise and other albums.

Solo career
Venom took a break in 1988 and so Cronos embarked on a solo career and occasionally featured in many other bands of a similar genre, including Cronos, Enthroned, Cradle of Filth (Cronos contributed a monologue to the end of the Cradle track "Haunted Shores," from their 1996 album Dusk... and Her Embrace), Warpath, Massacre, and Necrodeath. He also produced some albums for other bands.

In 1995, Cronos contacted the original guitarist and drummer and reformed the original Venom lineup, where they headlined the Dynamo Festival in 1996. Venom tried to continue with the original lineup members but only managed to play one show per year for the next few years. They had signed a three album deal with CBH/Steamhammer in Germany, but when they took the option for the second album after Cast in Stone, certain members did not want to continue. Venom employed a stand in drummer for the next album, Resurrection, which was well received by the critics, although they still only managed to play two shows, Wacken and Holland. 

Venom took another short break after Cronos was hurt in a climbing accident, but in 2004, Cronos enlisted his 'Cronos band' guitarist 'Mykas' and set about rebuilding the band's reputation with the album Metal Black in 2006, and a sold out UK tour in the UK and four headline shows at major European festivals. In 2007, Cronos replaced the guitarist with 'Rage, releasing the album Hell in 2008 and again touring to sell-out shows. By 2009, 'Dante' joined the band, and starting with a full South American tour, Venom continue to headline many various festivals each year. As of 2019, the lineup of Cronos, Rage and Dante is 10 years old, with three albums such as 2011's Fallen Angels, 2015's From the Very Depths, and 2018's Storm the Gates.

Later activity

In 2000, the band went on to headline the Wacken Open Air Festival in Germany and play a one-off show in the Netherlands before they were forced to take a break after Cronos was injured in a climbing accident in 2002, which left him unable to play bass or sing for nearly two years. He took to the computer to pass the time and studied computing and games programming, he learned 3D software skills and worked as the main multimedia engineer for the computer and internet solutions companies K-Class Systems and Globalfibre.tv, where along with company owner Scott Toward, they created the first computer models for streaming media for the internet and mobile phones, as well as programming and building gaming maps and developing internet access via satellites.

Cronos again reformed Venom in around 2003, temporarily recruiting an unknown basic nu-metal drummer and guitarist, as he just needed a couple of average players to help him kick start the band while he looked for professional permanent musicians. Cronos had asked guitarist Mantas to rejoin the band, although he declined his offer releasing a statement on Blabbermouth saying he would never rejoin Venom as he was working in a new direction with his new band 'Zero Tolerance' and was in the process of recording an album. 

After Cronos spent the next couple of years of planning and intensive rehearsals, Venom released their album, Metal Black, in early 2006, and they embarked on a sold out world tour. Venom played the classic single "Die Hard" along with Phil Anselmo (Pantera, Down) in the Gods of Metal 2006 in Italy, where they headlined. Cronos appeared on Dave Grohl's heavy metal side project Probot in 2004, and guest starred on the track Knights of the 21st Century on HammerFall's 2005 album Chapter V: Unbent, Unbowed, Unbroken.

Discography

With Venom
 Welcome to Hell (1981)
 Black Metal (1982)
 At War with Satan (1984)
 Possessed (1985)
 Eine Kleine Nachtmusik (1986)
 Calm Before the Storm (1987)
 Cast in Stone (1997)
 Resurrection (2000)
 Metal Black (2006)
 Hell (2008)
 Fallen Angels (2011)
 From the Very Depths (2015)
 Storm the Gates (2018)

With Cronos
Dancing in the Fire (1990)
Rock n' Roll Disease (1991)
Venom (Cronos compilation album) (1995)
Hell to the Unknown (2006, anthology release)

Other appearances
Inhuman Condition by Massacre (1992) – vocals on "Warhead"
Dusk... and Her Embrace by Cradle of Filth (1996) – spoken word on "Haunted Shores"
Probot by Probot (2004) – vocals and bass on "Centuries of Sin"
Chapter V: Unbent, Unbowed, Unbroken by HammerFall (2005) – vocals on "Knights of the 21st Century"

References

External links

1963 births
20th-century English male singers
20th-century English singers
21st-century English male singers
21st-century English singers
English heavy metal bass guitarists
Male bass guitarists
English heavy metal singers
Living people
Rhythm guitarists
Black metal musicians
Black metal singers